The 2018 Russian Open was a badminton tournament which took place at Sport Hall Olympic in Vladivostok, Russia, from 24 to 29 July 2018 and had a total purse of $75,000.

Tournament
The 2018 Russian Open was the fifth Super 100 tournament of the 2018 BWF World Tour and also part of the Russian Open championships which had been held since 1992. This tournament was organized by the National Badminton Federation of Russia with the sanction from the BWF.

Venue
This international tournament was held at Sport Hall Olympic in Vladivostok, Primorsky Krai, Far Eastern Federal District, Russia.

Point distribution
Below is the point distribution table for each phase of the tournament based on the BWF points system for the BWF Tour Super 100 event.

Prize money
The total prize money for this tournament was US$75,000. Distribution of prize money was in accordance with BWF regulations.

Men's singles

Seeds

 Pablo Abián (third round)
 Vladimir Malkov (semi-finals)
 Misha Zilberman (quarter-finals)
 Parupalli Kashyap (second round)
 Subhankar Dey (quarter-finals)
 Pannawit Thongnuam (withdrew)
 Kalle Koljonen (third round)
 Sourabh Verma (champion)

Finals

Top half

Section 1

Section 2

Bottom half

Section 3

Section 4

Women's singles

Seeds

 Evgeniya Kosetskaya (first round)
 Lee Ying Ying (second round)
 Natalia Perminova (first round)
 Yvonne Li  (semi-finals)
 Kisona Selvaduray (withdrew)
 Sri Krishna Priya Kudaravalli (withdrew)
 Mugdha Agrey (second round)
 Kristin Kuuba (quarter-finals)

Finals

Top half

Section 1

Section 2

Bottom half

Section 3

Section 4

Men's doubles

Seeds

 Vladimir Ivanov / Ivan Sozonov (semi-finals)
 Konstantin Abramov / Alexandr Zinchenko (final)
 Shia Chun Kang / Tan Wee Gieen (withdrew)
 Tarun Kona / Saurabh Sharma (withdrew)

Finals

Top half

Section 1

Section 2

Bottom half

Section 3

Section 4

Women's doubles

Seeds

 Chow Mei Kuan / Lee Meng Yean (final)
 Ekaterina Bolotova / Alina Davletova (quarter-finals)

Finals

Top half

Bottom half

Mixed doubles

Seeds

 Evgenij Dremin / Evgenia Dimova (semi-finals)
 Rohan Kapoor / Kuhoo Garg (final)
 Saurabh Sharma / Anoushka Parikh (quarter-finals)
 Rodion Alimov / Alina Davletova (second round)

Finals

Top half

Section 1

Section 2

Bottom half

Section 3

Section 4

References

External links
 Tournament Link

Russian Open (badminton)
Russian Open
Russian Open (badminton)
Sport in Vladivostok
July 2018 sports events in Russia